Christian Anthony Gómez Vargas (born 23 February, 1999) is a Venezuelan professional footballer who plays as midfielder. He is currently free agent.

Career 
Gómez was part of the Mineros de Guayana from 2017 to 2021, making 44 appearances for the club, scoring 2 goals. He also helped the team to the Copa Venezuela title in 2017. In 2018 he spent a season on loan with Dominican side Atlético San Francisco, where the team were runners up in the league.

On 16 March 2021, Gómez signed with USL Championship side Hartford Athletic. He made his debut for Hartford on 13 June 2021, appearing as a 62nd-minute substitute during a 3–2 loss to Charlotte Independence.

Honours

Club 
Mineros
 Copa Venezuela: 2017

References

External links 
 Hartford Athletic bio

1999 births
Living people
Venezuelan footballers
Association football midfielders
A.C.C.D. Mineros de Guayana players
Hartford Athletic players
USL Championship players
Venezuelan expatriate footballers
Venezuelan expatriate sportspeople in the Dominican Republic
Venezuelan expatriate sportspeople in the United States
Expatriate footballers in the Dominican Republic
Expatriate soccer players in the United States
21st-century Venezuelan people